"Take Me In" is the fourth and final single released from Powderfinger's second album Double Allergic. The single was released on 12 May 1997, and received a warm response from fans, although it was not as successful as the prior singles from the album.  The video clips for Double Allergic were released onto a video (and later re-released on DVD) with the same cover as "Take Me In" with the small video collection titled "Take Me In".

Track listings

CD single
 "Take Me In"
 "Skinny Jean" (live)
 "Tail" (live)

Video/DVD
 "Take Me In"
 "Skinny Jean" (live)
 "Tail" (live)
 "Living Type"
 "D.A.F."

Charts

References

Powderfinger songs
1997 singles
1996 songs
Polydor Records singles
Songs written by Jon Coghill
Songs written by John Collins (Australian musician)
Songs written by Bernard Fanning
Songs written by Ian Haug
Songs written by Darren Middleton